An ultop is a traditional toy, made from bamboo and  common in the Batak Highland of northern Sumatra, Indonesia. Children often make this toy.

The ultop consists of two pieces.  The first is a small bamboo with a diameter around 2–5 cm, the inside of which is shaped like a funnel. Two edges of the bamboo are cut until both edges can be seen through the funnel.  The second piece is a rod with an outside diameter slightly smaller than the inside diameter of the funnel.  Grain or fruit, slightly larger than the diameter of the funnel, is placed in the funnel and the rod is pressed against it as hard as the child can.  The fruit or grain will be forced out with great speed and the sound like a small explosion.  This makes it the local equivalent of a pop gun.

Indonesian culture
Traditional toys
Batak